KLVT (1230 AM) is a radio station broadcasting a brand new Talk Radio format licensed to Levelland, Texas, United States. The station is owned by Tania Moody, through licensee Cute Boots Broadcasting LLC, and features programming from ABC Radio, as well as local sports and local morning/call-in/flea market show.

History 
KLVT was first licensed to Forrest Weimhold who owned the Levelland newspaper. He and attorney Al Allison went to Washington and met with Texas Senator Lyndon Johnson who was a member of the relevant FCC committee. 

Forrest sold the station in 1959 to Marshall Formby to raise money to purchase a 4-color printing press for the newspaper.

Programming
KLVT simulcasts call-in show "Tradio" on KZZN AM 1490, based in Littlefield. KLVT Sports Department broadcasts Levelland Lobo football games, basketball games, and baseball games as well as Loboette volleyball games, basketball games and softball games. KLVT is also the voice of South Plains College Texans and Lady Texans basketball.

KLVT also features smaller local high schools, Thursdays and Fridays, with their respective school activity reports, and covers a full lineup of sports for Sundown and Morton online at www.klvtradio.com.

References

External links
KLVT Radio Facebook

LVT
Classic country radio stations in the United States